Nikola Gjoshevski (born 1 April 1979) is a retired Macedonian professional football player who currently works as a FIFA intermediary agent. He is the owner and CEO of the Macedonia-based football players' agency Sports Management Consulting.

Playing career

Club
Gjosevski played international club level football as a left full back. During his career, he played for:
 FC Vardar Negotino (Republic of Macedonia);
 FC Makedonija Gjorce Petrov (Republic of Macedonia);
 FC Sileks Kratovo (Republic of Macedonia);
 FC Rabotnicki Skopje (Republic of Macedonia);
 FC Vardar Skopje (Republic of Macedonia);
 FC Spartak Moscow (Russia);
 FC Red Bull Salzburg (Austria);
 FC Midtjylland (Denmark);
 FC Ethnikos Pireous (Greece);
 FC Rhodos (Greece);

His most successful period in club-level football was as part of FC Vardar Skopje, after the summer of 2003 when FC Vardar Skopje nearly entered the Liga Champions groups, eliminated CSKA Moscow, and lost to Sparta Praga after only one goal advantage. After exiting Liga Champions qualifications, FC Vardar Skopje lost in a Liga Europa game against FC Roma Italy.

After a great summer 2003 and fantastic games with FC Vardar Skopje, Gjosevski became captain of FC Vardar Skopje next 1,5 years after quitting FC Vardar Skopje for FC Red Bull Salzburg from Austria in January 2005.

International
Gjosevski is player with the most appearances for Macedonia U-21 national team with more than 25 matches played for U-21 and been captain of U-21 Macedonia 5 games.

Football director and agent
After finishing football playing career in FC Rhodos (Greece), he became Sport Director in FC Metalurg Skopje (Republic of Macedonia) from January 2010 until August 2012 providing the club second place in Macedonia League 2 years i a row and first time in the club history European games in Liga Europa.

Nikola Gjosevski football agent career starts from August 2012 opening his agency company "Sports Management Consulting".

Personal life
Nikola Gjosevski graduated Economy University - Management Department in "St. Kiril and Metodij" University in Skopje in 2004.

External links
 http://www.sportsmc.mk

1979 births
Living people
People from Negotino
Association football fullbacks
Macedonian footballers
North Macedonia under-21 international footballers
FK Sileks players
FC Spartak Moscow players
FK Vardar players
FC Red Bull Salzburg players
FC Midtjylland players
Ethnikos Piraeus F.C. players
FK Rabotnički players
Rodos F.C. players
Macedonian First Football League players
Russian Premier League players
Austrian Football Bundesliga players
Danish Superliga players
Football League (Greece) players
Macedonian expatriate footballers
Expatriate footballers in Russia
Macedonian expatriate sportspeople in Russia
Expatriate footballers in Austria
Macedonian expatriate sportspeople in Austria
Expatriate men's footballers in Denmark
Macedonian expatriate sportspeople in Denmark
Expatriate footballers in Greece
Macedonian expatriate sportspeople in Greece
Association football agents